Tore Schweder (born 16 January 1943) is a Norwegian statistician and is a professor at the Department of Economics and at the Centre for Ecology and Evolutionary Synthesis at the University of Oslo. Schweder has worked with scientists in a number of fields, including medicine, demography, sociology, economics, ecology, genetics and fisheries. Since 1990, most of his applied work has been concerned with assessment of marine resources (fish and whales), and with the problem of uncertainty in fisheries management. His methodological research interests also include basic connections between likelihood and confidence, cf. confidence distributions.

Schweder has been a member of the Scientific Committee of the International Whaling Commission since 1989, and is an elected member of the Norwegian Academy of Science and Letters. He was the 2011 recipient of the Sverdrup Prize. In April 2013, his wide-ranging contributions to the theory and applications of statistics were honoured by a Statistics Day at the Academy of Sciences.

External links 
 Schweder's page at the Department of Economics
 Schweder's page at CEES
 Statistical Day 2013

Norwegian statisticians
Fisheries scientists
1943 births
Living people
Members of the Norwegian Academy of Science and Letters
20th-century Norwegian zoologists